Pierre Sikivie (born 29 October 1949) is an American theoretical physicist and currently the Distinguished Professor of Physics at University of Florida in Gainesville, Florida. He invented the axion haloscope and the axion helioscope and has played an important role in the development of axion cosmology.

Academic career 
Sikivie completed his Licencie en Sciences from University of Liège, Belgium in 1970 and completed his Ph.D. in Physics under Feza Gürsey from Yale University in 1975 with thesis Lepton and Hadron Spectra in Universal Gauge Theories. He was a research associate at Dept. of Phys., Univ. of Maryland from 1975 to 1977 and at SLAC from 1977 to 1979. He became Senior Fellow at CERN from 1979 to 1981 and assistant professor at University of Florida from 1981 to 1984. He became an associate professor of physics at University of Florida in 1984, and promoted to professor in 1988. He received his present title of "Distinguished Professor" in 2012. He is the 2020 recipient of the Sakurai Prize.

In 1994 Sikivie was elected a Fellow of the American Physical Society. He was a Guggenheim Fellow for the academic year 1997–1998.

Dark matter axion physics 
Sikivie played a crucial role in the development of the Axion Dark Matter eXperiment (ADMX). He collaborated with his colleagues, Neil S. Sullivan and David B. Tanner, at University of Florida and developed the experimental details of ADMX. In 1983, Sikivie, along with J. Preskill, M. B. Wise, F. Wilczek, L. F. Abbott, M. Dine, and W. Fischler, discovered that cosmic axions created from mis-alignment mechanism can be a substantial fraction of Dark Matter. Later Sikivie laid the theoretical ground for dark matter axion detections such as the ADMX.

See also
Axion
Dark Matter
ADMX

References

External links 
 Personal Page of Pierre Sikivie
 The ADMX

1949 births
Living people
People from Sint-Truiden
21st-century American physicists
University of Liège alumni
Yale University alumni
Fellows of the American Physical Society
University of Florida faculty
Theoretical physicists
People associated with CERN
J. J. Sakurai Prize for Theoretical Particle Physics recipients